Présilly may refer to:

 Présilly, Jura, a commune in the French region of Franche-Comté
 Présilly, Haute-Savoie, a commune in the French region of Rhônes-Alpes